Équihen-Plage is a commune in the Pas-de-Calais department in the Hauts-de-France region of France.

Geography

Population

Places of interest
 The church of St. Pierre, rebuilt after World War II.
 A village that uses upcycled boats as the roofs of homes.

See also
Communes of the Pas-de-Calais department

References

External links

 Official website of Equihen-plage 
 Tourism in Boulogne and the Boulonnais region

Equihenplage
Populated coastal places in France